Paruparo is a genus of butterflies in the family Lycaenidae. The species of this genus are found in the Indomalayan realm.

Species
Paruparo mamertina (Hewitson, 1869)
Paruparo cebuensis (Jumalon, 1975)
Paruparo cebuensis chotaroi (H. Hayashi, 1977)
Paruparo annie Takanami, 1982
Paruparo lumawigi (Schröder, 1976)
Paruparo violacea (Schröder & Treadaway, 1978)
Paruparo mio Hayashi, Schröder & Treadaway, 1984
Paruparo rosemarie Seki, 1993
Paruparo kuehni (Röber, 1887)

External links
"Paruparo Takanami, 1982" at Markku Savela's Lepidoptera and Some Other Life Forms

 
Lycaenidae genera